Chinghee Creek is a rural locality in the Scenic Rim Region, Queensland, Australia.

History 
Chinghee Creek State School opened on 26 February 1912. It closed in December 1973. The school was at 495 Chinghee Creek Road.

The locality contained 16 households, in which 48.5% of the population were males and 51.5% of the population were females with a median age of 43, 5 years above the national average. The average weekly household income was $1,292, $146 below the national average.

Education 
There are no schools in Chinghee Creek. The nearest primary school is Hillview State School in Hillview. The nearest secondary school is Beaudesert State High School in Beaudesert .

References 

Scenic Rim Region
Localities in Queensland